Zalambdalestes (meaning much-like-lambda robber) was a eutherian mammal, most likely not a placental due to the presence of an epipubic bone, living during the Upper Cretaceous in Mongolia.

 Zalambdalestes was a hopping animal with a long snout, long teeth, a small brain and large eyes. It had strong front paws and even stronger rear ones, sharing specializations to saltation similar to those of modern rabbits.

Its diet was probably composed mainly of insects that it hunted in the forest undergrowth using its sharp, interlocking teeth. Unlike modern placental mammals, Zalambdalestes had an epipubic bone, meaning it was probably restricted reproductively in the same way as modern monotremes and marsupials.

References
 Parker, Steve. Dinosaurs: the complete guide to dinosaurs. Firefly Books Inc, 2003. Pg. 402

Further reading
 

Prehistoric eutherians
Natural history of Mongolia
Late Cretaceous mammals of Asia
Fossil taxa described in 1926
Djadochta fauna
Prehistoric mammal genera